Moosacher St.-Martins-Platz is a railway station on the Munich U-Bahn rapid transit network which opened on 11 December 2010.

References

External links

Munich U-Bahn stations
Railway stations in Germany opened in 2010
Buildings and structures completed in 2010